Francisco Cabello may refer to:

 Francisco Cabello (cyclist) (born 1969), Spanish road bicycle racer
 Francisco Cabello (tennis) (born 1972), Argentine tennis player